Ronald Heifetz (born February 7, 1951) is the King Hussein bin Talal Senior Lecturer in Public Leadership, Founding Director of the Center for Public Leadership at Harvard Kennedy School at Harvard University, and co-founder of Cambridge Leadership Associates.

Known for his seminal work during the past three decades on the practice and teaching of leadership, his research focuses on how to build adaptive capacity in societies, businesses, and nonprofits. His book Leadership Without Easy Answers (Belknap/Harvard University Press, 1994) has been translated into many languages and is currently in its 13th printing. He also coauthored the bestselling book Leadership on the Line: Staying Alive through the Dangers of Leading with Marty Linsky (Harvard Business School Press, 2002). His most recent book, The Practice of Adaptive Leadership: Tools and Tactics for Changing Your Organization (Harvard University Press, 2009). A sequel to "Leadership On The Line," it provides a more hands-on approach to identifying personal and organizational practices related to mobilizing organizations around adaptive challenges.

Formerly a Clinical Instructor in Psychiatry at Harvard Medical School, Heifetz works extensively with leaders in government, nonprofits, and business. His consultations and seminars with individuals, executive committees and leadership teams focus on the work of leaders in generating and sustaining adaptive change across political boundaries, operating units, product divisions, and functions in politics, government agencies and international businesses. For example, Heifetz spoke as a part of the non-profit Central New York Famous Entrepreneurs Series in March 2009.

Recently, Heifetz' work on adaptive leadership has garnered attention in educational fields by promoting a new approach towards leadership education that focuses on teaching leadership in ways that build capacity to address adaptive leadership problems.  In the book, "Leadership Can Be Taught," Sharon Daloz Parks writes about the processes and practice of Heifetz in his classroom teaching leadership to upcoming leaders.  Named "case-in-point" (CIP) teaching, this method focuses on implementing aspects of Heifetz' work within the class itself, thereby turning the classroom into a leadership laboratory where learners can analyze on the immediate, relevant leadership dynamics occurring before them. CIP has four main distinctions: 1) authority does not equal leadership, 2) understanding the difference between technical and adaptive challenges, 3) Power (of the individual) vs. progress, and 4) Personality (of the individual) vs. presence (skills & practice).   The benefits of Heifetz' CIP model help bridge the current disconnect between learning, teaching, and applying leadership whereby educators may discuss leadership cases or examples within the classroom, but often leave the analysis of impact of personal leadership behaviors to individual reflection outside of the classroom.  CIP focuses on bringing leadership to the forefront by analyzing behaviors occurring within the classroom space.  To date, a number of leadership educators at universities and organizations across the nation, most notably the University of Minnesota, University of San Diego  as well as the Kansas Leadership Center, utilize CIP practices in their work.

Heifetz is a graduate of Columbia University, Harvard Medical School, and the John F. Kennedy School of Government. He is also a cellist and former student of Gregor Piatigorsky. His brother is violinist Daniel Heifetz, Founder & Artistic Director of the Heifetz International Music Institute.

Books  
Heifetz, Ronald A., Grashow, Alexander, and Linsky, Marty. The Practice of Adaptive Leadership: Tools and Tactics for Changing Your Organization and the World. Harvard Business Review Press, 2009.
Heifetz, Ronald A., and Marty Linsky. Leadership on the Line: Staying Alive through the Dangers of Leading (Chinese translation). Bardon-Chinese Media Agency, 2003.
Heifetz, Ronald A., and Linsky, Marty. Liderazgo Sin Limites: Manual de Supervivencia para Managers. Paidos, 2003.
Heifetz, Ronald A., and Linsky, Marty. Leadership on the Line: Staying Alive through the Dangers of Leading. Harvard Business School Press, 2002.
Heifetz, Ronald A., and Linsky, Marty. I Skudlinjen, Hvordan man overlever i Lederskabets Jungle. Borsens, 2002.
Heifetz, Ronald A. Leadership Without Easy Answers. Belknap Press of Harvard Business School Press, 1994.
Book Chapters  
Heifetz, Ronald A. "Anchoring Leadership in the Work of Adaptive Progress." The Leader of the Future 2: Visions, Strategies, and Practices for the New Era. Eds. Frances Hesselbein, Marshall Goldsmith. Jossey-Bass, 2006.
Heifetz, Ronald A. "Adaptive Learning." Encyclopedia of Leadership. Ed. George R. Goethals, Georgia J. Sorenson, and James MacGregor Burns. Sage Publications, 2004.
Heifetz, Ronald A., and Marty Linsky. "Leadership Is 1% Inspiration and 99% Perspiration." MBA in a Box. Ed. Joel Kurtzman; with Glenn Rifkin and Victoria Griffith. Crown Business, 2004.
Heifetz, Ronald A., and Marty Linsky. "Self-Management." Encyclopedia of Leadership. Ed. George R. Goethals, Georgia J. Sorenson, and James MacGregor Burns. Sage Publications, 2004.
Academic Journals  
Heifetz, Ronald A., Grashow, Alexander, and Linsky, Marty. "Leadership in a (Permanent) Crisis." Harvard Business Review. July/Aug 2009. pp. 62–69.
Heifetz, Ronald A., John V. Kania, and Kramer, Mark R. "Leading Boldly." Stanford Social Innovation Review. Winter 2004. pp. 20–31.
Heifetz, Ronald A., and Linsky, Marty. "When Leadership Spells Danger." Educational Leadership 61.7 April 2004. pp. 33–37.
Heifetz, Ronald A. and Laurie, Donald L. "The leader as teacher: Creating the learning organization." Ivey Business Journal Online. Jan/Feb 2003.
Heifetz, Ronald A. and Laurie, Donald L. "The work of leadership." Harvard Business Review. December 2001. pp. 131–140.
Heifetz, Ronald A. "Staying alive." Nieman Reports. Fall 1997. pp. 63–69.
Newspaper or Magazine Articles 
Heifetz, Ronald A., Linsky, Marty, and Grashow, Alexander. "Making decisions outside your repertoire." Business Week Online. June 19, 2009. 
Heifetz, Ronald A. "Making it even more difficult for our leaders to really lead." The San Diego Union-Tribune, San Diego, Calif. Aug. 15, 1996. p. B9.
Heifetz, Ronald A. "Who's to blame?" Boston Globe, Boston, Mass. Oct. 28, 1994. p. 19.
Heifetz, Ronald A. "We're to blame." New York Times, New York, NY. Nov. 8, 1994. p. A23.
Trade Journals 
Heifetz, Ronald A. "A survival guide for leaders." Business Credit. March 2003. pp. 44–52.
Heifetz, Ronald A. and Linsky, Marty. "Managing people politics: Line up partners, position your enemies, and control those on the fence-six lessons in being a leader." CIO. June 15, 2002.
Heifetz, Ronald A. "The challenge to change." Security Management. October 1999. pp. 29–31.
Heifetz, Ronls A. "Walking the fine line of leadership." The Journal for Quality and Participation. Jan/Feb 1998. pp. 8–14.
Heifetz, Ronald A. and Laurie, Donald L. "Adaptive strategy." Executive Excellence. December 1998. pp. 14–15.

References

External links
Professor Ron Heifetz - Adaptive Leadership in 21st Century Presentation
A profile of Ronald Heifetz
 An interview with Heifetz
 Fast Company, The Leader of the Future

1951 births
Living people
People from Cambridge, Massachusetts
Columbia University alumni
American cellists
American psychiatrists
Harvard Medical School alumni
Harvard Kennedy School faculty
Harvard Kennedy School alumni
Leadership scholars